KSWH-LP (102.5 FM, "The Pulse 102.5") is a College radio station licensed to serve Arkadelphia, Arkansas.  The station is owned by the Henderson State University Foundation. It airs a College radio format.

The station was assigned the KSWH-LP call letters by the Federal Communications Commission on September 15, 2003. However, it traces its history to a full-service, but even lower-power, license on 91.1 MHz.

History

KSWH-FM
On November 19, 1968, then–Henderson State College filed with the Federal Communications Commission to build a new, 10-watt Class D educational radio station on 88.1 MHz in Arkadelphia. The application was approved on March 21, 1969; on September 5, KSWH signed on the air. Two years later, it moved to 91.1 MHz. An early 1980s bid to upgrade power to 6,460 watts was abandoned by 1985.

KSWH-LP

Into the 2000s, KSWH-FM still broadcast with 10 watts. In 2001, Henderson State University filed for a construction permit to build a new low-power FM radio station, with up to 100 watts of effective radiated power. The application was approved in 2003, and in 2004, the KSWH operation moved from 91.1 to 99.9. The KSWH-FM Class D license was not surrendered until 2014.
The station was issued a license to move from 99.9 MHz to 102.5 MHz on April 2, 2014. The change had been made on March 7 after adjacent-channel KWPS-FM in Caddo Valley notified KSWH-LP that it was interfering; the commercial station provided assistance through the frequency change.

Alumni
Bobby Bones, radio morning show host

References

External links 
KSWH-LP official website
Henderson State University
 

SWH-LP
SWH-LP
SWH-LP
Radio stations established in 1969
Clark County, Arkansas
Henderson State University
1969 establishments in Arkansas